Fred Nuamah (born Frederick Kwaku Nuamah; November 5, 1975) is a Ghanaian actor, film director and producer best known for his role in the movie The Game. He is the founder and CEO of Ghana Movie Awards & Ghana TV series Awards, an annual award show that recognises excellence in the Ghanaian film industry).

Life and career
Nuamah was born in Accra, and hails from Ada and Obuasi, a city located in Ashanti Region Southern part of Ghana.

His rose to prominence after he starred in the movie Matters of the Heart in 1993. He went on to play supporting roles in films including The Prince Bride, Heart of Men, Material Girl and 4 Play. In 2010, Nuamah appeared in The Game , directed by Abdul Salam Mumuni. 

Nuamah played a role in Amakye and Dede which premiered at the Silverbird Cinemas in Accra on March 26, 2016.

Ghana Movie Awards
On 1 January 2009, Nuamah founded the Ghana Movie Awards where he holds the position of CEO.

Selected filmography
 Matters of the Heart, 1993 (Cameo Role)
 The Prince Bride (Supporting Role) 2009
 The Heart of Men (Supporting Role) 2009
 The Game, 2010
 Material Girl (Supporting Role) 2010
 4 Play (Supporting Role) 2010
 Temptation (Supporting Role) 2010
 4 Play Reloaded (Supporting Role) 2011
 Pool Party (Supporting Role) 2011
 Amakye and Dede, 2016

References

External links
 

Living people
Ghanaian male film actors
1975 births
Ghanaian film producers